Olive Township is located in Madison County, Illinois, in the United States. As of the 2010 census, its population was 1,785 and it contained 842 housing units.  The township's administrative offices are located in the village of Livingston.

History
Olive Township was organized in 1876. Abel Olive was an early settler.

Geography

Interstate 55, Illinois Route 4 and the former U.S. Route 66 all pass through the township.

There are two villages located in the township: Livingston and Williamson.

Demographics

References

External links
City-data.com
Illinois State Archives

Townships in Madison County, Illinois
Townships in Illinois